Purkayastha is an Indian surname which is more prevalent in Bengal and Assam. The surname is found among Bengali Kayastha, as well as among Bengali Brahmins. "Purkayastha" is actually a title rather than a surname, as "Kayastha" is a term used for "administrator" and "Pur" signifies an administrative unit such as a city, town or a kingdom.

Notable People 

 Debapratim Purkayastha, Indian educator
 Ian Purkayastha, the founder of Regalis, a New York based luxury foods company
 Kabindra Purkayastha, former union minister of state of India
 
 Surajit Kar Purkayastha, Indian police officer
 Swarupam Purkayastha, Indian cricketer

References 

Surnames
Bengali Hindu surnames